Nesvrta may refer to two villages in southern Serbia:

 Nesvrta (Leskovac)
 Nesvrta (Vranje)